Pernis is a neighborhood and submunicipality (since 3 March 2010) of Rotterdam, Netherlands. The district has a population of 4,845 (2018) on a total area size of 1.60 km² (0.62 sq mi). Pernis is thus a full submunicipality of Rotterdam, but the former independent municipality had its own district council already. Although surrounded by ports, Pernis has preserved its village-like atmosphere very well.

Pernis is best known for its petrochemical industry. Refineries define its skyline. Shell's sprawling complex located there is the largest oil refinery in Europe, and one of the largest in the world.

Pernis was merged with 's-Gravenambacht in 1832. It remained an independent municipality until 1934, when it was merged into Rotterdam.

Demography
 
Residents by age (2011)

Births and deaths(2010)

Residents by origin (2011)

Household composition (2011)

Born in Pernis
 Sjaak Troost (born 1959) – Feyenoord football (soccer) defender

See also
Langebakkersoord
Rotterdam Metro.

References

External links
Website of the district council of Pernis

Populated places in South Holland
Former municipalities of South Holland
Boroughs of Rotterdam